Trần Minh Lợi (born 19 September 1986) is Vietnamese footballer who plays for the TĐCS Đồng Tháp as a midfielder.

Growing up Minh Loi was often made fun of and pushed around for his small stature, but after graduating from the An Giang academy he has quickly cemented his position at Dong Thap as the captain.

References

1986 births
Living people
Vietnamese footballers
Association football midfielders
V.League 1 players
Dong Thap FC players